Gila River Indian Reservation was a reservation established in 1859 by the United States government in New Mexico Territory, to set aside the lands of the Akimel O’odham (Pima) and the Piipaash (Maricopa) people along the Gila River, in what is now Pinal County, Arizona. The self-government of the reservation as the Gila River Indian Community was established by Congress in 1939.

History
The Pima Villages and some of their lands were included in the Gila River Indian Reservation in 1859. An Indian Agency was established at Casa Blanca with Silas St. John, (station agent of the Butterfield Overland Mail at Casa Blanca Station), appointed on February 18, 1859, as Special Agent for the Pima and Maricopa Indians.  Agent St. John also conducted a census of the villages later that year.

References

Gila River
Geography of Maricopa County, Arizona
Geography of Pinal County, Arizona
Native American history of Arizona
History of Arizona
Gila River Indian Community
1859 establishments in New Mexico Territory